The 2022 Men's FIH Hockey5s was a men's field hockey series, staged in the Hockey5s format. The tournament was held at the Place de la Navigation in Lausanne, from 4–5 June.

The competition marked the first time the International Hockey Federation hosted a senior international tournament in the Hockey5s format. The tournament was held simultaneously with a women's event.

India won the tournament, defeating Poland 6–4 in the final.

Results

Preliminary round

Fixtures

Final

Awards

Goalscorers

References

External links
International Hockey Federation

International field hockey competitions hosted by Switzerland
Hockey5s
Hockey5s
Sport in Lausanne
FIH Hockey5s